Antonis Antoniadis (Greek: Αντώνης Αντωνιάδης, born 25 May 1946) is a Greek former professional footballer who played as a striker. He scored 243 goals during his 22-years long career. He started his career in 1964 playing for Aspida Xanthi before moving to Panathinaikos on 31 July 1968. Antoniadis scored his first official goal for Panathinaikos on 27 October 1968 in a 1–0 victory over Apollon Athens. During his time at Xanthi, he was sometimes used as a goalkeeper because of his height. His nickname was Ο Ψηλός, The Tall.

Career

Antoniadis scored 187 goals in 242 matches in the Greek Championship, and was top scorer five times: in 1970 (25 goals), 1972 (39 goals), 1973 (22), 1974 (26) and 1975 (20). In 1971,when Panathinaikos reached the European Cup Final against Ajax, Antoniadis was the leading scorer in the tournament with 10 goals.

During the summer of 1978 he was transferred to Olympiakos where he stayed for one season, playing in 13 games and scoring 7 goals. He later went on to play for Atromitos Athens. In 1980, before he retired and became president of PSAP, he went full circle and returned to Panathinaikos. Antoniadis is renounced for his accurate heading and long, powerful shots. He made 21 appearances and scored 6 goals for the Greece national team between 1970 and 1977. He has the vice-president of the football team of Panathinaikos Athletic Club since the summer of 2008.

Honours

Panathinaikos
Alpha Ethniki: 1968–69, 1969–70, 1971–72, 1976–77
Greek Cup: 1968–69, 1976–77
European Cup: 1971 (runner-up)
Intercontinental Cup: 1971 (runner-up)
Balkans Cup:  1977

Greece military
World Military Cup: 1969

Individual
Beta Ethniki top scorer: 1966–67, 1967–68
Alpha Ethniki top scorer: 1969–70, 1971–72, 1972–73, 1973–74, 1974–75 (record)
European Cup top scorer: 1970–71
European Silver Boot: 1971

References

1946 births
Living people
Greek footballers
Greece international footballers
Pontic Greeks
Olympiacos F.C. players
Panathinaikos F.C. players
Xanthi F.C. players
Atromitos F.C. players
Super League Greece players
Association football forwards
Footballers from Xanthi
UEFA Champions League top scorers